This is a list of Canadian natural gas companies:

ATCO - based in Edmonton, Alberta
AltaGas - based in Calgary, Alberta
Anderson
Canadian Natural Resources - based in Calgary
Dejour Energy - based in British Columbia
Direct Energy - formerly based in Toronto and now based in Houston, Texas
Enbridge - based in Calgary: acquired Consumers' Gas Company from British Gas
Ferus Natural Gas Fuels (Ferus NGF) - based in Calgary, Alberta
FortisBC - based in Kelowna, British Columbia
Gaz Métro  - based in Québec
Manitoba Hydro - provided by Centra Gas - based in Winnipeg, Manitoba
Pengrowth - based in Calgary
Progress Energy Resources - based in Calgary
SaskEnergy - based in Regina, Saskatchewan
SemCams Natural Gas - based in Calgary
Union Gas - based in Chatham, ON
Tourmaline Oil - based in Calgary
Peyto Exploration & Development - based in Calgary

References

Natural gas
Canadian natural gas